The Taoyuan Leopards are a Taiwanese professional basketball team based in Taoyuan City, Taiwan. They have competed in the T1 League since the 2021–22 season, and play their home games at the National Taiwan Sport University Multipurpose Gymnasium. The Leopards became one of the six teams of the inaugural T1 League season.

Home arenas 
 Chung Yuan Christian University Gymnasium (2021–2022) 
 Taipei Heping Basketball Gymnasium (2022) 
 Taoyuan Arena (2022) 
 National Taiwan Sport University Multipurpose Gymnasium (2022–present)

Current roster 

<noinclude>

Personnel

General managers

Head coaches

Season-by-season record

Notable players 
Local players
  Chang Chih-Feng (張智峰) – Chinese Taipei men's national basketball team player, SBL MVP (2009), SBL Finals MVP (2009)
  Lin Yi-Huei (林宜輝) – Chinese Taipei men's national basketball team player
  Su Yi-Chieh (蘇翊傑) – Chinese Taipei men's national basketball team player, SBL Final MVP (2017)
Import players
  Deyonta Davis – NBA player
  Michael Efevberha – Nigeria men's national basketball team player
  Dwight Howard – NBA player, United States men's national basketball team player
  Adam Łapeta – Poland men's national basketball team player
  Daniel Orton – NBA player
  Troy Williams – NBA player

References

External links 
 
 
 
 

Taoyuan Leopards
T1 League teams
2021 establishments in Taiwan
Basketball teams established in 2021
Sport in Taoyuan City